Phrynocephalus ornatus is a species of agamid lizard found in Iran, Pakistan, and Afghanistan,

Diagnosis: Dorsal scales enlarge very gradually from flanks to mid-dorsal line, homogeneous; nasal shields in contact; no spinose scales on neck or back of head; both sides of fourth and outer aspect of third toes strongly fringed; three scales separate nasals from upper labials; two or three suborbital scales, none larger than adjacent scales; no dark-margmed dorsolateral stripe between fore and hind limbs. Tail 119-132 percent of snout-vent length (Anderson 1999: 93). 

.

References

ornatus
Reptiles described in 1887
Taxa named by George Albert Boulenger